The authorities of the Socialist Federal Republic of Yugoslavia established many World War II memorials during its existence. Several memorial sites were established between 1945 and 1960, though widespread building started after the founding of the Non-Aligned Movement.

Yugoslav president Josip Broz Tito commissioned several memorial sites and monuments in the 1960s and 1970s dedicated to World War II battles, and Nazi concentration camp sites. They were designed by notable sculptors, including Dušan Džamonja, Vojin Bakić, Miodrag Živković, Jordan and Iskra Grabul, and architects, including Bogdan Bogdanović and Gradimir Medaković. After Tito's death, a small number were built, and the monuments were popular visitor attractions in the 1980s as patriotic sites, and since the Yugoslav Wars and the dissolution of Yugoslavia, the sites are mostly abandoned.

In Slovenia, World War II Veteran Organisation and its branches yearly hold many commemorative events in regard with the subject of the monuments and people remember the fallen on the Day of the Dead.

On August 28, 2018, author Donald Niebyl published a book titled Spomenik Monument Database, the first-ever English-language guidebook on the WWII monuments of Yugoslavia, after conducting several years of intensive research.

For the list of World War II monuments in each republic of the Former Yugoslavia, see:
List of World War II monuments and memorials in Bosnia and Herzegovina
List of World War II monuments and memorials in Croatia
List of World War II monuments and memorials in Montenegro
List of World War II monuments and memorials in Macedonia
List of World War II monuments and memorials in Serbia
List of World War II monuments and memorials in Slovenia

See also
People's Heroes of Yugoslavia monuments
World War II memorials and cemeteries in the Netherlands
Canadian war memorials

Further reading

External links 
 Spomenik Database - An exploration of Yugoslav-era WWII monuments
 25 Abandoned Yugoslavia Monuments that look like they're from the Future

 
Yugoslav culture
Propaganda in Yugoslavia